Monge Island is a small rocky island off the coast of Antarctica, lying immediately south of La Conchée and  northeast of Cape Mousse. It was charted in 1951 by the French Antarctic Expedition and named after French mathematician Gaspard Monge.

See also 
 List of Antarctic and sub-Antarctic islands

References

Islands of Adélie Land